The Intimate Ellington is a studio album by the American pianist, composer and bandleader Duke Ellington, compiled from sessions recorded in 1969, 1970 and 1971, and released on the Pablo label in 1977.

Reception

The AllMusic review by Scott Yanow states: "Even this late in his life, Duke Ellington had a great deal to say musically and his band continued to rank near the top".

Track listing
All compositions by Duke Ellington except as indicated
 "Moon Maiden" - 2:42  
 "Edward the First" - 3:20  
 "Symphonette" (Ellington, Billy Strayhorn) - 5:03  
 "Intimate Interlude" - 5:01  
 "Some Summer Fun" - 5:18  
 "Layin' on Mellow" - 2:13  
 "Eulb" - 2:34  
 "Tenz" - 2:27  
 "I Got It Bad (And That Ain't Good)" (Ellington, Paul Francis Webster) - 5:30  
 "Sophisticated Lady" (Ellington, Irving Mills, Mitchell Parish) - 4:57  
 "Edward the Second" - 5:44
Recorded at National Recording Studio, New York, NY on May 23, 1969 (track 2), July 14, 1969 (track 1), August 29, 1969 (track 6), June 15, 1970 (track 5), December 9, 1970 (track 9 & 10), February 1, 1971 (track 11), February 2, 1971 (track 4), May 5, 1971 (track 3), June 29, 1971 (tracks 7 & 8).

Personnel
Duke Ellington – piano (tracks 2-11), celeste & vocals (track 1)
Wild Bill Davis - organ (tracks 6, 9 & 10)
Cat Anderson (tracks 4, 5 & 9-10), Willie Cook (track 6), Mercer Ellington (tracks 3, 5, 7 & 8), Money Johnson (tracks 3, 4, 7-10), Al Rubin (tracks 9, 10),  Frank Stone (track 5), Cootie Williams (tracks 3-5, 7-10), Richard Williams (tracks 7 & 8) - trumpet 
Lawrence Brown (track 6), Julian Priester (track 5), Malcolm Taylor (tracks 3, 4, 7-10), Booty Wood (tracks 3-5, 7-10) - trombone
Chuck Connors - bass trombone (tracks 3-5, 7-10)
Johnny Hodges (track 6), Buddy Pearson, (track 3, 7 & 8), Norris Turney (tracks 3-5, 7-10) - alto saxophone
Russell Procope - alto saxophone, clarinet (tracks 4-10) 
Harold Ashby (tracks 3-10), Paul Gonsalves (tracks 3, 4 & 6-8) - tenor saxophone
Harry Carney - baritone saxophone (tracks 3-10)
Joe Benjamin (track 3-5, 7-11), Paul Kondziela (track 2, 6) - bass
Rufus Jones (track 2-11) - drums

References

Pablo Records albums
Duke Ellington albums
1977 albums